Kevin Owen Foley (born 25 September 1960) is a former South Australian politician who served as 11th Deputy Premier of South Australia and additionally Treasurer of South Australia in the Rann Government from 2002 to 2011 for the South Australian Branch of the Australian Labor Party. He is the longest-serving deputy premier and the third longest-serving treasurer in South Australian history.

Early life
Foley was raised in Port Adelaide and educated at Royal Park High School. He left school at the age of 16 and began working for Cadbury-Schweppes. He later worked variously for the Australian Trade Commission, Boral Limited and steel distribution company Australian National Industries.

Immediately before entering Parliament, Foley worked as a senior advisor and chief of staff to then South Australian Premier Lynn Arnold.

Political career
Foley unsuccessfully contested seat of Semaphore at the 1989 election against Independent Labor MP Norm Peterson. However, he won the seat of Hart at the 1993 election before moving to the seat of Port Adelaide due to Hart's abolition at the 2002 election.

Prior to the 2002 election, Foley did not serve in the position of Deputy Opposition Leader. However, as a result of previous Deputy Leader Annette Hurley failing to win a seat in Parliament at the 2002 election Foley was elected deputy leader and treasurer by the Labor Caucus.

As treasurer, Foley was responsible for rebuilding the state's finances, culminating in the attainment of a AAA credit rating. He also played a leading role in securing a series of significant defence contracts, negotiating the Olympic Dam mine expansion and supporting many of the state's largest infrastructure projects, such as the Adelaide Oval redevelopment and the new Royal Adelaide Hospital.

Whilst in Government, Foley served in a range of other cabinet positions, including Minister for Industry, Investment and Trade; Minister for Federal/State Relations; Minister Assisting the Premier in Economic Development; Minister for Police; Minister for Defence Industries; Minister for Emergency Services, Minister for Motor Sport; and Minister Assisting the Premier with the Olympic Dam Expansion Project.

Foley was a member of the Defence SA Advisory Board from its establishment in 2007 until 2011.

In 2011, Foley said that he thought Australia should embrace nuclear power.

Foley announced his resignation from the roles of deputy premier and treasurer in February 2011, although he continued as a member of cabinet with the Defence, Police, Emergency Services and Motor Sports portfolios. In October 2011 he resigned from the cabinet, coinciding with Mike Rann's resignation as premier. Foley's parliamentary resignation took effect on 12 December 2011, creating a 2012 Port Adelaide by-election.

Post-parliamentary career
In February 2012, Foley established his own corporate advisory firm Foley Advisory, and has a "strategic alignment" with the lobbyists Bespoke Approach. Foley has since worked closely with Bespoke Approach's partners Alexander Downer, Nick Bolkus and Ian Smith. As of 2021, Sky City Casino is one of the companies he lobbies for in South Australia.

References

External links

 

1960 births
Living people
Deputy Premiers of South Australia
Members of the South Australian House of Assembly
Treasurers of South Australia
Australian Labor Party members of the Parliament of South Australia
21st-century Australian politicians